The Journey Up is a 1938 novel by the British writer Robert Hichens.

References

Bibliography
 Vinson, James. Twentieth-Century Romance and Gothic Writers. Macmillan, 1982.

1938 British novels
Novels by Robert Hichens
Cassell (publisher) books